The Romanian Qualifying Grand Prix 2011 is the first qualifying Gliding Grand Prix for the FAI World Grand Prix 2010–2011 that took place in Romania.

References 

Gliding competitions
International sports competitions hosted by Romania